Langenburg is a town in the district of Schwäbisch Hall, in Baden-Württemberg, Germany. It is located on a hill above the river Jagst, 18 km northeast of Schwäbisch Hall. It is also the place where Wibele - small, sweet, biscuit-like pastries - were invented and are still baked today.

History

The history of Langenburg begins with the building of a castle on the western hill crag. Prehistoric settling is likely, but not proven. Langenburg is first documented in 1226. The free Lords of Langenburg, which stepped into history in 1201, were closely related to the Lords of Hohenlohe. Maybe they even held family bonds. After the Langenburgs had died out, the Hohenlohe family inherited the possessions. Langenburg thus came under the rule of Hohenlohe and remained part of the Principality for the next centuries.
Since 1568 Langenburg was the residency of the county and latter principality Hohenlohe-Langenburg.

In the 17th Century, Langenburg was the site of witch trials.  The last victims, Anna Schmieg and Barbara Schleicher, were executed in 1672.

Sights

Langenburg has a vintage car museum and the large Langenburg Castle, the seat of the family of Hohenlohe-Langenburg. The current owner of the castle and estate is Philipp, Prince of Hohenlohe-Langenburg.

People 

 Philip Ernest, Count of Hohenlohe-Langenburg (1584-1628), landowner, Count of Hohenlohe-Langenburg
 Henry Frederick, Count of Hohenlohe-Langenburg (1625-1699), landowner, Count of Hohenlohe-Langenburg
 Albert Wolfgang, Count of Hohenlohe-Langenburg (1659-1715), landowner, Count of Hohenlohe-Langenburg
 Ludwig, Prince of Hohenlohe-Langenburg (1696-1765), landowner, 1st Prince of Hohenlohe-Langenburg
 Christian Albrecht, Prince of Hohenlohe-Langenburg (1726-1789), landowner, 2nd Prince of Hohenlohe-Langenburg
 Karl Ludwig, Prince of Hohenlohe-Langenburg (1762-1825), landowner, 3rd Prince of Hohenlohe-Langenburg
 Ernst I, Prince of Hohenlohe-Langenburg (1794-1860), landowner, 4th Prince of Hohenlohe-Langenburg
 Viktor I, Duke of Ratibor (1818-1893), landowner and politician
 Carl Ludwig II, Prince of Hohenlohe-Langenburg (1829-1907), landowner and politician, 5th Prince of Hohenlohe-Langenburg
 Hermann, Prince of Hohenlohe-Langenburg (1832-1913), landowner and politician, 6th Prince of Hohenlohe-Langenburg
 Ernst II, Prince of Hohenlohe-Langenburg (1863-1950), landowner and politician, 7th Prince of Hohenlohe-Langenburg
 Gottfried, Prince of Hohenlohe-Langenburg (1897-1960), landowner, 8th Prince of Hohenlohe-Langenburg

Gallery

Bibliography

References

Schwäbisch Hall (district)
Württemberg